Rarities may refer to:
Rarities (1978 The Beatles album), released in the UK
Rarities (1980 The Beatles album), released in the US
Rarities (Beach Boys album), 1983
Rarities, an album by the Stranglers, 1988
Rarities (Roxette album), 1995
Rarities (The Presidents of the United States of America album), 1997
Rarities (Atomic Rooster album), 2000
Rarities (Emilíana Torrini album), 2000
Rarities, a bonus CD by Repulsion with the album Horrified, 2002 reissue
Rarities 1994–1999, an album by Silverchair, 2002
The Rarities, an album by the Stranglers, 2002
Rarities (Tatsuro Yamashita album), 2002
Rarities (Ron Sexsmith album), 2003
Rarities (Indigo Girls album), 2005
Rarities 1971–2003, an album by the Rolling Stones, 2005
Rarities (Kinky album), 2006
Rarities (Black 'n Blue album), 2007
Rarities (The Living End album), 2008
Rarities 1979-1981, an album by Cardiac Kidz, 2010
Rarities (Gin Blossoms album), 2010
Rarities (Soviettes album), 2010
Rarities (Jean Michel Jarre album), 2011
Rarities (Selah Sue album), 2012
Rarities (Shakespears Sister album), 2012
Rarities (1998–2017), an album by Natalie Merchant, 2017
Rarities, a compilation album of "rare" songs by Blue Öyster Cult, 2017
Rarities (Smile Empty Soul album), 2017
The Rarities (Mariah Carey album), 2020
Rarities (Goo Goo Dolls album), 2021
Rarities Volumes 1 & 2, a compilation album by Lindsay Cooper
Rarities Volume I & Volume II, a compilation album by the Who

See also 
B-Sides and Rarities (disambiguation)
Medium Rarities (disambiguation)
Rarity (disambiguation)